John Lewe (or Liew) was one of the two Members of Parliament for Ipswich in 1399. His dates of birth and death are unrecorded.

References

Lewe
14th-century births
Date of death unknown